Wasp is a 1957 science fiction novel by English author Eric Frank Russell. Terry Pratchett (author of the Discworld series of fantasy books) stated that he "can't imagine a funnier terrorists' handbook." Wasp is generally considered Russell's best novel.

The title of Wasp comes from the idea that the main character's actions and central purpose mimic that particular insect; just as something as small as a wasp can terrorise a much larger creature in control of a car to the point of causing a crash and killing the occupants, so the defeat of an enemy may be wrought via psychological and guerrilla warfare by a small, but deadly, protagonist in their midst.

Plot summary

Set in an unspecified time in the future, the plot centres on protagonist James Mowry and an inter-planetary war between humans (collectively referred to as "Terrans") and the Sirians (collectively referred to as the Sirian Empire, from Sirius). The war has been in effect for nearly a year as the story begins. The Terrans, while technologically more advanced in most respects to the Sirians, are outnumbered and out-gunned by a factor of twelve-to-one.

The Sirians are a humanoid species that share many of the same physical characteristics as their Terran enemies. Some of the more noticeable differences are their purple-faced complexions, pinned-back ears, and a bow-legged gait. In terms of government, the Sirian Empire is reminiscent of fascist states that existed in the Second World War; they frequently employ a much-feared secret police force named the Kaimina Tempiti, or Kaitempi; they censor much of their media, and they actively seek to quell any opposition to the government or the war through the use of violence and intimidation.

The novel begins by introducing James Mowry as he is being recruited by the Terran government to infiltrate enemy lines; to become a "wasp", in the sense portrayed in the opening passages of the novel. His recruitment is somewhat less than voluntary: Mowry is offered the alternative of conscription and assignment to the front. His dossier states that he can be counted on to do anything, provided the alternative is worse. So persuaded, he accepts the assignment.

Notwithstanding the method of persuasion, Mowry is an ideal recruit, having spent the first seventeen years of his life living under the Sirian Empire. After extensive linguistic and cultural training and surgery designed to make him appear to be Sirian, he is sent to the Sirian outpost world of Jaimec to begin his mission. The first phase of his mission involves placing stickers with subversive slogans all over the Jaimecan towns in the hope of beginning to create the first murmurings of confusion and concern in Sirian society.

Completing his first objective, Mowry begins the second: sending letters to various people of importance informing them of several deaths by his hand. These threats are always signed by a mythical rebel organisation named Dirac Angestun Gesept (Sirian Freedom Party) and often emblazoned by the slogan,  "War makes wealth for the few, misery for the many. At the right time, Dirac Angestun Gesept will punish the former, bring aid and comfort to the latter."

Following this, Mowry moves on to phase three, the hiring of Sirian civilians as contract killers to kill prominent members of the Kaitempi and other government officials. With the Sirians becoming more concerned about the disruption they believe the D.A.G. is causing, Mowry's success allows him to move on to phase four of his plan.

The fourth phase involves Mowry planting fake wire tapping devices on several buildings (including the Kaitempi headquarters) to engender paranoia. He also continues to spread rumours via Sirian civilians to plant other seeds of doubt among the populace.

With a Terran invasion imminent, Mowry is told to skip to phase nine of his operation: the sabotaging of Jaimecan sea-ships in another effort to divert the Sirians' concern away from the real – and approaching – threat. This time, the Terrans strike and the invasion begins. Mowry is captured by a Terran spaceship and is held for a few days before a government man recognises that he is not Sirian, but Terran. The novel ends with a government man informing Mowry that a wasp on another world has been captured, and that he is the replacement.

Themes 

The novel portrays the Sirian Empire's censorship, suppression, and police state as folly and oppressive. Wasp frequently employs wry, black humour when dealing with these ideas and themes.

Reception 
Terry Pratchett talks of the ironic nature in Russell's storytelling; that Wasp is a "funn[y] terrorists' handbook". An example of this humour is found in the protagonist's letter to the Sirian Central Bureau of Records in which he mockingly registers the rebel organisation Dirac Angestun Gesept as a legitimate organisation:

The novel has also been praised for its gritty realism. Along with the alien culture being more believable by including slang (such as "yar" for yes and "nar" for no), Mowry's creative disruption is seen as astute. As Rupert Neethling of infinity plus states, "One has to wonder whether Eric Frank Russell applied firsthand knowledge of espionage or sabotage when writing his 1957 classic, Wasp. At the very least, he seems to have had access to some kind of saboteur's checklist."  As Russell was in the Royal Air Force during World War Two, he may well have had firsthand experience of the operations of the British Special Operations Executive agents who were trained to disrupt the Nazis in occupied Europe in much the same way as Mowry does in Wasp.

Galaxy reviewer Floyd C. Gale praised the novel, saying "Russell has invested this hard-boiled yarn with plenty of action and authenticity."

Dave Langford reviewed Wasp for White Dwarf #76, and stated that "Fast and funny - but less so than Granada'''s definitive editions, which like Dobson's hardback gained much from Russell's later (1958) revisions."

Post-9/11 reception

James Nicoll has noted that Wasp "reads differently post-9/11 than it did before 9/11".

James Sallis, writing in The Boston Globe, discusses how prescient Russell now seems. Wasp'' "gives off jolts of shock that Russell could not have anticipated." Sallis quoted Russell,

References

External links

 Wasp preserved at the Internet Archive (alternate link)

1957 British novels
Novels by Eric Frank Russell
British science fiction novels
1957 science fiction novels
English novels
Novels set on fictional planets
Fiction set around Sirius
British spy novels